Emilio Tuero Cubillas (5 April 1912 – 22 July 1971), known as Emilio Tuero, was a Spanish-Mexican actor, producer, and singer. He was considered a popular star of the Golden Age of Mexican cinema.

Filmography 

 Cri Cri el grillito cantor (1963)
 Viva el amor (1956)
 The Bandits of Cold River (1956)
 Historia de un amor (Cautivos del recuerdo) (1955)
 Salón de Belleza (1951
 Quinto patio (1950)
 Autumn and Spring (1949)
 Tuya para siempre (1948)
 The Desire (1948)
 María la O (1947)
 Dizziness (Vértigo) (1946)
 Ave de paso (1945)
 Tú eres la luz (1945)
 Club Verde (El recuerdo de un vals) (1944)
 El Recuerdo de aquella noche (1944)
 El Camino de los gatos (1943)
 La dama de las camelias (1943)
 No matarás (1943)
 Internado para señoritas (1943)
 Resurrección (1943)
 Yo bailé con don Porfirio (1942)
 El baisano Jalil (1942)
 El ángel negro (1942)
 El que tenga un amor (1942)
 Mil estudiantes y una muchacha (1941)
 Noche de recién casados (1941)
 Dos mexicanos en Sevilla (1941)
 Cuando los hijos se van (1941)
 Al son de la marimba (1940)
 ¡Cuando la tierra tembló! (1940)
 En tiempos de don Porfirio (Melodías de antaño) (1939)
 Miente y serás feliz (1939)
 Mujeres y toros (1939)
 Una luz en mi camino (1938)
 Juan Soldado (1938)
 El Rosario de Amozoc (1938)
 La India Bonita (1938)
 Tras la reja (1936)
 Mexicana (1935)
 La isla maldita (1934)
 El inocente (1929)

References

External links 

 ITESM Mexican Cinema page for "Emilio Tuero".

1912 births
1971 deaths
People from Santander, Spain
Mexican male film actors
Actors from Cantabria
20th-century Mexican male actors
Spanish emigrants to Mexico